Murmidius ovalis, known generally as the minute beetle or murmidius beetle, is a species of beetle in the family Murmidiidae. It is found in Europe and Northern Asia (excluding China) and North America.

References

External links

 

Coccinelloidea
Articles created by Qbugbot
Beetles described in 1817